Tarhasi Block is one of the administrative blocks of Palamu district, Jharkhand state, India situated in the bank of amanat river.

Colleges and Schools in Tarhasi
 SSMS Degree College Tarhasi
 Govt. Middle School Tarhasi
 IGG High School Tarhasi
 RK+2 High School Tarhasi
 Kashturba Gandhi Vidyalay
 Kanya Prathamik Vidyalay

Transport
 The nearest airport is 173 kilometers away in Ranchi. the nearest railway station is 35 km away in Daltonganj. Tarhasi is well connected with Daltonganj, Ranchi, Delhi, Panki, Lesliganj, Manatu, Sherghati, Gaya and Patan by road. The major transport of Tarhasi is Autorickshaw and Buses

See also
 Palamu Loksabha constituency
 Jharkhand Legislative Assembly
 Jharkhand
 Palamu

References
Blocks of Palamu district
SSMS Degree College Tarhasi

Community development blocks in Jharkhand
Community development blocks in Palamu district